Yekeson Subah (born February 13, 2004) is an American soccer player who plays as a forward for MLS Next Pro  side Los Angeles FC 2.

Club career
Subah joined the North Carolina FC academy in 2016, where he played before signing an academy contract with the club's USL League One side for the 2021 season. 

He made his debut on May 22, 2021, appearing as an 81st-minute substitute in a 0–0 draw with Richmond Kickers.

In June 2021, Subah left North Carolina to join the Real Salt Lake academy. On September 15, 2021, Subah signed a professional deal with Salt Lake's USL Championship side Real Monarchs.

Personal life
Born in the United States, Subah is of Liberian descent.

Career statistics

References

2004 births
Living people
American soccer players
Association football forwards
North Carolina FC U23 players
North Carolina FC players
Real Monarchs players
USL Championship players
USL League One players
USL League Two players
Soccer players from North Carolina
Sportspeople from North Carolina
American people of Liberian descent
MLS Next Pro players
21st-century American people